The 1944–45 NHL season was the 28th season of the National Hockey League. Six teams each played 50 games. The Toronto Maple Leafs won the Stanley Cup in seven games versus the Detroit Red Wings.

League business
In October 1944, Lester Patrick sponsored W. G. Hardy to become NHL president, replacing Red Dutton who wanted to step down. Patrick credited Hardy for being largely responsible for the current professional-amateur agreement between the NHL and the amateur associations in the International Ice Hockey Association, and said he was "temperamentally suited and has an excellent record as an executive of the Canadian Amateur Hockey Association".

Dutton offered to resign because of business concerns, but the league's board of governors dissuaded him. Conn Smythe, at one point, was offered the presidency, but turned it down. Dutton then stayed on.

Regular season
It was the year of the "Punch Line" as Rocket Richard scored 50 goals in 50 games, breaking Joe Malone's record of 44 goals, and when Richard scored his 45th, Malone was on hand to present him with the record-breaking puck. Richard had a five-goal, three-assist night against
Detroit at the Montreal Forum on December 28, 1944. His centreman, Elmer Lach, though, won the scoring race with 26 goals and 80 points. Toe Blake finished third with 29 goals, 38 assists, and for the second time, an entire line finished first, second, third scoring. The previous time had been in 1939–40, when the Boston Bruins' Kraut Line of Milt Schmidt, Bobby Bauer and Woody Dumart accomplished the feat. Schmidt finished with 52 points in 48 games that year, and Bauer and Dumart 43 apiece.

Montreal dared not loan Paul Bibeault to Toronto again with his fine year the previous season and loaned him instead to Boston. But the Maple Leafs came up with a fine rookie named Frank McCool who won the Calder Memorial Trophy as the league's top rookie. For the first time, a team produced three consecutive top rookies. McCool and Chicago netminder Mike Karakas tied for the league lead in shutouts with four each.

Bill Durnan won his second consecutive Vezina Trophy with Montreal. Flash Hollett became the first defenceman to score twenty goals in one season. The record would stand until Bobby Orr broke it several decades later.

A major trade that occurred this year was Chicago trading their great defenceman Earl Seibert to Detroit for Don Grosso, Cully Simon and Byron "Butch" McDonald. After team owner Frederic McLaughlin died, it was just a matter of time before Bill Tobin would trade Seibert, as the two did not get along.

Final standings

Playoffs

Playoff bracket

Semifinals

(1) Montreal Canadiens vs. (3) Toronto Maple Leafs

The Montreal Canadiens finished first in the league with 80 points. The Toronto Maple Leafs finished third with 52 points. This was the fourth playoff meeting between these two teams with Montreal winning the two of the three previous series. They last met in previous year's Stanley Cup Semifinals where the Canadiens won in five games. Toronto won this season's ten-game regular-season series earning eleven of twenty points.

(2) Detroit Red Wings vs. (4) Boston Bruins

The Detroit Red Wings finished second in the league with 67 points. The Boston Bruins finished fourth with 36 points. This was the fourth playoff meeting between these two teams with Detroit winning the two of the three previous series. They last met in the 1943 Stanley Cup Finals where the Red Wings won in four games. Detroit won this season's ten-game regular-season series earning nineteen of twenty points.

Stanley Cup Finals

This was the eighth playoff meeting between these two teams with Toronto winning four of the seven previous series. They last met in the 1943 Stanley Cup Semifinals where Detroit won in six games. Detroit won this season's ten-game regular-season series earning seventeen of twenty points.

Awards

Player statistics

Scoring leaders
Note: GP = Games played, G = Goals, A = Assists, PTS = Points, PIM = Penalties in minutes

Source: NHL

Leading goaltenders

Note: GP = Games played; Min – Minutes played; GA = Goals against; GAA = Goals against average; W = Wins; L = Losses; T = Ties; SO = Shutouts

Coaches
Boston Bruins: Art Ross
Chicago Black Hawks: Johnny Gottselig
Detroit Red Wings: Jack Adams
Montreal Canadiens: Dick Irvin
New York Rangers: Frank Boucher
Toronto Maple Leafs: Hap Day

Debuts
The following is a list of players of note who played their first NHL game in 1944–45 (listed with their first team, asterisk(*) marks debut in playoffs):
Fern Flaman, Boston Bruins
Murray Henderson, Boston Bruins
Pete Horeck, Chicago Black Hawks
Ted Lindsay, Detroit Red Wings
Bill Ezinicki, Toronto Maple Leafs
Frank McCool, Toronto Maple Leafs

Last games
The following is a list of players of note that played their last game in the NHL in 1944–45 (listed with their last team):
Bill Thoms, Boston Bruins
Cully Dahlstrom, Chicago Black Hawks
Mush March, Chicago Black Hawks
Johnny Gottselig, Chicago Black Hawks
Kilby MacDonald, New York Rangers
Bucko McDonald, New York Rangers
Jack McLean, Toronto Maple Leafs
John McCreedy, Toronto Maple Leafs

See also
1944-45 NHL transactions
List of Stanley Cup champions
1944 in sports
1945 in sports

References
 
 
 
 
 
 

Notes

External links
Hockey Database
NHL.com

 
1
1